

Composition of a US Army Division Sustainment Support Battalion (DSSB)  
The DSSB is organic to a Division Sustainment Brigade (DSB). The DSSB and its subordinate units move and displace to maintain pace with the DSB and division headquarters. The DSSB commands and controls all organic, assigned, and attached units and conducts support operations in the Division area of operations(AO). As directed by the DSB commander, the DSSB performs maintenance, transportation, supply, and distribution.   

DSSBs have the following organic units permanently assigned
Composite supply company
Composite truck company
Support maintenance company. 

Other capabilities are task organized by the division commander based on support requirements. The DSSB synchronizes and executes logistics support to BCTs and multifunctional support brigades attached to the division and non-divisional units operating in the division AO.  The division sustainment support battalion is employed using various task-organizations as shown in figure below. The division sustainment support battalion is a renamed combat sustainment support battalion. It is organic to division sustainment support brigades assigned to divisions. The division sustainment support battalion and its subordinate units must be able to move and displace at the pace of large-scale combat operations. The division sustainment support battalion commands and controls all organic, assigned, and attached units. As directed by the division support brigade commander. Division sustainment support battalions organic to division sustainment brigades supporting divisions have an organic composite supply company, composite truck company, and support maintenance company. Other capabilities are task organized by the division commander in accordance with requirements. The division sustainment support battalion synchronizes and executes logistics support to BCTs and multifunctional support brigades attached to the division.

Division sustainment support battalion conducts:
Maintenance 
Transportation
Supply 
Field services
Distribution

Current Active Duty DSSB's see also: Sustainment Brigades in the United States Army

See also
 Reorganization plan of United States Army
 Coats of arms of U.S. Support Battalions
 FM 3-90.5 Combined Arms Battalion  APR 2008
 FM 3-90.6 Brigade Combat Team SEP 2010
 ATP 4-90 Brigade Support Battalion APR 2014
 ATP 4-93 Sustainment Brigade AUG 2013
 ATP 4-94 Theater Sustainment Command  JUN 2013
 FM 4-95 Logistics Operations APR 2014

References

External links
"Sustainment Units at the Institute of Heraldry"

Support_battalions_of_the_United_States_Army